Danielle Christine Fishel (born May 5, 1981) is an American actress, director, model, and television personality. She began her career in theater, appearing in community productions of The Wizard of Oz and Peter Pan. She made her debut as an actress shortly after, making guest appearances in shows such as Full House and Harry and the Hendersons. In 1993, Fishel was cast for the role as Topanga Lawrence-Matthews on the teen sitcom Boy Meets World, which ran on ABC, and reprised the role for its successor Girl Meets World on Disney Channel, which aired from 2014 to 2017.

Fishel was the host of Style Network's The Dish, and appears in National Lampoon's Dorm Daze, as well as its sequel. She was a spokeswoman for Nutrisystem, and is also a resident reporter on PopSugar, and on their spin-off YouTube channel, PopSugar Girls Guide.

Early life
Fishel was born in Mesa, Arizona, the daughter of Jennifer, a personal manager, and Rick Fishel, former President of Masimo Corporation. She is of partial Maltese descent. She graduated from Calabasas High School in Calabasas, California in 1999.

Career

1991–1998: Career beginnings and debut 
In 1991, at the age of 10, Fishel was discovered in a community theater where she performed in two productions, The Wizard of Oz and Peter Pan. She quickly moved on to do voice-overs and commercials, including several as a Barbie Girl for Mattel. Soon after, she appeared on two episodes of the hit show Full House, guest starring as a character named Jennifer. She also had a small role on Harry and the Hendersons, playing Jessica. Fishel's mother became her full-time manager.

In 1993, at the age of 12, Fishel began her well-known role as Topanga Lawrence-Matthews on the ABC series Boy Meets World. Originally written as a small part, Topanga became a recurring role. After a successful first year, Fishel became a show regular. Fishel's character was a sparky, intelligent girl who was mature beyond her years; she replaced the nerdy Stuart Minkus as the brains of the class. The show ended in 2000 after seven years.

Fishel was on the cover of Seventeen in December 1998. She took home a 1998 Young Star for Best Performance by a Young Actress in a Comedy TV Series. In June 1999, she was one of "The 21 Hottest Stars Under 21" as presented by Teen People. Fishel was on the cover of GQ'''s hottest stars to watch in GQ's 1997 October issue. She appeared in the music video for "Until You Loved Me" by Canadian music group The Moffatts.

 2003–2011: Films and television presenting 
Following Boy Meets World, Fishel began to work heavily in television, and in 2003 co-hosted Say What? Karaoke on MTV for one season. Fishel also appeared in several films, including National Lampoon's Dorm Daze. In 2006, she appeared in three made-for-DVD releases: National Lampoon's Dorm Daze 2 (appearing again as "Marla" from the first film), the action film Gamebox 1.0 (playing a dual role), and The Chosen One, an independent animated film in which she provides the voice of the lead female character.

In 2006, Fishel appeared as a guest on The Tyra Banks Show where she discussed her dramatic weight loss with the use of the Nutrisystems Diet. Following her appearance on the show, Fishel became a spokeswoman for Nutrisystem. She also became a special correspondent for The Tyra Banks Show, starting in early February 2007. By 2010 she had gained some of the weight back, and told People magazine she could not maintain her Nutrisystem weight.

From August 2008 to March 2011 Fishel hosted The Dish for the Style Network, which satirized pop culture in a format similar to sister network E!'s The Soup. Fishel was also on Fuse TV as host of The Fuse 20, and was a guest star on the round table on an episode of Chelsea Lately. In 2012, Fishel became the host of MSN TV's Last Night on TV.

 2013–present: Current work 
In 2013, though not released until 2015 Fishel starred in the drama Boiling Pot, which is based on true events of racism that occurred on college campuses across the country during the 2008 Presidential election. The film also stars Louis Gossett Jr., Keith David, M. Emmet Walsh, and John Heard. Fishel plays an average college girl, naive regarding racism and unaware of its existence. In October 2013, she was featured in Clapping for the Wrong Reasons, a short film to promote Childish Gambino's second studio album, Because the Internet.

In 2014, Fishel reprised her role of Topanga Lawrence-Matthews in the Boy Meets World spin-off series, Girl Meets World. The series premiered on Disney Channel on June 27, 2014, and features Topanga and her Boy Meets World love interest Cory Matthews (Ben Savage) married in their adult years with two children. The series follows Cory and Topanga's daughter Riley (Rowan Blanchard)  and her friend, Maya (Sabrina Carpenter) as she enters middle school and tries to navigate through life. The series ended on January 20, 2017 with Topanga declining a job offer that would have moved the family to London and out of New York.

In an episode that aired January 9, 2018, she competed against actor Jonathan Lipnicki on TBS's Drop the Mic.

She has hosted the Boy Meets World rewatch podcast Pod Meets World with Rider Strong and Will Friedle since 2022.

Personal life
At age 27, Fishel began attending California State University, Fullerton (CSUF), graduating in 2013. During her university studies, she became a math tutor, leading her to meet fellow student Tim Belusko. After over three years of dating, she became engaged to Belusko in May 2012. They married on October 19, 2013 in Los Angeles. Savage and Home Improvement cast member Jonathan Taylor Thomas were said to be in attendance at her Los Angeles wedding. In May 2016, it was reported that she had filed for divorce in 2015. The divorce was final in March 2016.

On July 4, 2017, toward the end of episode #303 of his podcast Get Up On This'', Jensen Karp announced that he was dating Fishel. On March 22, 2018, Fishel and Karp got engaged. They married on November 4, 2018. Fishel announced in January 2019 that she and Karp were expecting their first child in July 2019. On July 1, 2019, Fishel and Karp announced that Fishel gave birth to a boy in June 2019, almost one month early, via Instagram post. In August 2021, Fishel gave birth to their second son.

Filmography

Television

Film

Director

Accolades

References

External links

 
 

1981 births
20th-century American actresses
21st-century American actresses
Actresses from Arizona
Actresses from California
American child actresses
American film actresses
American people of Maltese descent
American television actresses
Television personalities from California
American women television personalities
California State University, Fullerton alumni
Living people
People from Mesa, Arizona
People from Yorba Linda, California
American television directors
American women television directors